was a Japanese singer and an actress from Chūō, Tokyo. She was the daughter of a famous Japanese painter of shin hanga style prints, Shinsui Itō, and her second husband was actor Masahiko Tsugawa.

Asaoka was in the Takarazuka Revue from 1952 to 1955. She was a cast member (musumeyaku), belonging to the Moon Troupe (Tsuki).

She was famous for her roles in Japanese television series and appeared starring opposite Shintaro Katsu in both a film from the Zatoichi series and in the first film of the Hanzo the Razor trilogy. She was, however, mostly famous for her singing. She was also a voice actor in the 1999 anime film My Neighbors the Yamadas directed by Isao Takahata.

She died of Alzheimer's disease.

Filmography
List of acting performances in film and television

References

External links
 
Yukiji Asaoka at Discogs

1935 births
2018 deaths
Japanese actresses
Japanese women musicians
People from Chūō, Tokyo
Takarazuka Revue
Nippon Columbia artists
Musicians from Tokyo
Recipients of the Order of the Rising Sun, 4th class